On 25 June 1973 the Speech at an Enlarged Meeting of the Political Committee of the Central Committee of the Workers' Party of Korea titled On the Five-point policy for National Reunification, Kim Il-sung summarised his policy as follows:

“Our five-point policy is: to remove military confrontation and lessen tensions between north and south, to realise many-sided cooperation and interchange between north and south, to convene a Great National Congress comprising representatives of people of all strata, political parties and social organisations from the north and south, to institute a north and south , to institute a north-south Confederation under the single nomenclature of Confederal Republic of Koryo, and to enter the UN under the single nomenclature–Confederal Republic of Koryo.”

References

Works by Kim Il-sung